The International Department of Shude High School () is an international school in Chengdu, China. Funded by Huaying Consulting and Service Co., Ltd .

History 
Ratified by MOE and MOPS, Huaying was founded in 1992 as an organization for training and applying of students who desire to study in Japan. With the continuous development over 10 years, Huaying had extended its goal into preparation for universities in other countries. 

In 2002, with the cooperation between Shude high school and Huaying Consulting and Service Co., Ltd. The International Department of Shude High School was established, as authorized by Chengdu education Bureau.

In 2002, Victorian Certificate of Education was invited to the school.

In 2012, authorized by the IBO, as the first publicly funded IB school in southwest China.

Shude International Department now has 12 classes, totaling 2453 graduates.

Present 
Three classes in grades 15 are currently split up among three different course categories at Shude International Department: IB, AP, and VCE. With each grade having two IB classes, two AP classes, and one VCE class.  

Students can join numerous clubs, including clubs for football, basketball, badminton, bowing, cooking, tech, computer, music, and ACG animation.

Graduates

Distribution of graduates through countries 

•IB program: 77% for USA, 17% for Canada, 2% for Britain, 2% for Netherlands, 2% for Germany.

•AP&VCE program: 73% for USA, 14% for Canada, 10.50% for Australia, 1.30% for Britain, 0.80% for other countries.

Sister schools 
 Haileybury College (Melbourne, Victoria, Australia)

References 

International schools in Chengdu
2002 establishments in China
Educational institutions established in 2002